This is a list of Chinese national-type primary schools (SJK(C)) in Johor, Malaysia. As of June 2022, there are 217 Chinese primary schools with a total of 87,780 students.

List of Chinese national-type primary schools in Johor

Batu Pahat District 
As of June 2022, there are 36 Chinese primary schools with 8,973 students in Batu Pahat District.

Johor Bahru District 
As of June 2022, there are 33 Chinese primary schools with 45,114 students in Johor Bahru District.

Kluang District 
As of June 2022, there are 21 Chinese primary schools with 5,924 students in Kluang District.

Kota Tinggi District 
As of June 2022, there are 9 Chinese primary schools with 1,491 students in Kota Tinggi District.

Mersing District 
As of June 2022, there are 4 Chinese primary schools with 723 students in Mersing District.

Muar District 
As of June 2022, there are 37 Chinese primary schools with 6,854 students in Muar District.

Pontian District 
As of June 2022, there are 25 Chinese primary schools with 3,501 students in Pontian District.

Segamat District 
As of June 2022, there are 20 Chinese primary schools with 4,693 students in Segamat District.

Kulai District 
As of June 2022, there are 12 Chinese primary schools with 7,163 students in Kulai District.

Tangkak District 
As of June 2022, there are 20 Chinese primary schools with 3,344 students in Tangkak District.

See also 

 Lists of Chinese national-type primary schools in Malaysia

Footnotes

References 

Schools in Johor
Johor
Chinese-language schools in Malaysia